The Beatles Experience is an eight-part comic book series by Revolutionary Comics as part of their Rock 'N' Roll Comics line. It was created and written by Todd Loren with artwork by penciller Mike Sagara and inker Lyndal Ferguson.

Publication history
Originally published in the early 1990s, The Beatles Experience was collected and reprinted by Bluewater Productions as a graphic novel in February 2010.

Plot
The story starts out re-imagining John Lennon's existence as a cosmic force that bears a resemblance to a star shape called the infinite one. He has grown tired of travelling his infinite spaces and planets so he goes to another being that is similar to him. He says that he wants to experience the illusions of a physical plane so the other being asks the soon-to-be Lennon many questions so that he may have the fullest enjoyment of his life. The final question asked is what would John like to learn from this experience, to which he responds trust and peace that will stay with him throughout all of his other lives he may have. The other cosmic being makes it so and John starts to narrate his own life from the day that his father Alfred (Fred) Lennon decides to leave John and his mother Julia Lennon. Before he leaves he offers John the choice to leave his mother and come with him to New Zealand and John says yes without hesitation but the cosmic one pulls John back to the plane he came from originally and warns John that if he goes with his father his time on our plane will not be as pleasant as John wanted to be.  John returns and states to his mother that he has changed his mind and that he wants to stay with his mother. Before they can leave together, John's Aunt Mimi says that she is taking custody of John until John's parents can work out their differences.

John then narrates the beginning of the lives of his future bandmates Paul McCartney, George Harrison and Ringo Starr and also the rest of his life until the point he meets Paul for the first time and they decide to play together. He then meets George and makes a writing partnership with Paul which works in a way to which if one of them writes a song they both get credit. Then John narrates the band's touring until they meet Brian Epstein for the first time and he agrees to get them a recording contract. When he does the band considers firing Pete Best as drummer but do not know who will replace him. Paul suggests Ringo Starr and he has been listening in the whole time and agrees so once again John starts to narrate but stops at the height of Beatlemania when his father returns to try to reap the fruits of John's success and tells him to go away so John narrates a huge portion of the Beatles' career and stops at the point where he meets Yoko Ono and develops a relationship with her. Some years later in John's career with the Beatles he becomes deeply depressed and is visited by a version of his cosmic self who tells him(self) that he needs to stop being so down on himself and get back to work writing and performing music.  He agrees but little does John know former President of the United States Richard Nixon has an anti-Lennon plan in place and splinter cell assassin named Mark David Chapman has been brain-washed to kill Lennon when commanded to. So Lennon exits his apartment building The Dakota and is gunned down by Chapman. John is now dead and back in his plane (which is apparently heaven) he looks down at his former life and decides to make sure Chapman cannot get out of his murder charge on government pardon. He enters Chapman's thoughts and tells him to plead guilty. John then narrates once more the rest of his bandmates' lives from 1980 through to the present and John one last time addresses the reader, saying that he has found peace and learned that peace can be found anywhere if one just imagines it.

The book ends with a tale of an alternate Earth almost completely similar to ours, except that in this world Paul McCartney was killed in a car accident and is replaced by a look-alike named William. Eventually this world's John Lennon found it out but could not tell anybody on threat of imprisonment, so he starts to put clues in the Beatles' songs albums, etc. The record company finds out what he is doing and tells him to stop but he does not. He also confronts the look-alike William who now believes that he is the real Paul McCartney, but in the end John dies. The company executive who knew died. Brian Epstein who also knew has died, so with all that, the secret itself has died. The final shot is of William looking in the mirror contemplating whether or not he is the real Paul or an impostor like John said, and saying that he knows he is Paul and could not have died if he is sitting where he is sitting. The final shot is his eyes with skulls in them, possibly symbolizing death.

References

Notes

Sources consulted 

1990s comics
1991 comics debuts
American graphic novels
Books about the Beatles
Comic book limited series
Comics based on musical groups